Queuñacocha (possibly from Quechua qiwña, qiwuña polylepis, qucha lake) or Hatun Queuñacocha is a small lake  in the Urubamba mountain range of the Cusco Region, Lares District, Calca Province, Peru. The lake lies north of Chicón, Sirihuani and Parorjo and southwest of Quisuarani, at an altitude of about 4,170 m. West of it there is another small lake called Quellacocha.

Queuñacocha lies in the private conservation area 'Hatun Queuña Quishuarani Collana' (possibly from in the Quechua spelling Hatun Qiwña Kiswarani Qullana) of the rural community Quishuarani Collana, founded in 2009 to protect the threatened polylepis pepei plant.

Images

See also
List of lakes in Peru

References

Lakes of Peru
Lakes of Cusco Region